The Apostolic Vicariate of Northern Solomon Islands was an exempt Roman Catholic Apostolic vicariate (missionary jurisdiction akin to a diocese) in the Northern Solomon Islands (in Oceania).

History 
On 23 May 1898, it was established as Apostolic Prefecture of German Solomon Islands on territory split from the Apostolic Vicariate of New Pomerania which was entrusted to the Missionaries of the Sacred Heart of Issoudun. On 21 January 1904, it was renamed as Apostolic Prefecture of Northern Solomon Islands.
 
On 31 May 1930, it was Promoted as Apostolic Vicariate of Northern Solomon Islands, with titular bishops as ordinaries. On 11 June 1959, it lost territory to establish the Apostolic Vicariate of Western Solomon Islands.
On 15 November 1966, it was promoted Roman Catholic Diocese of Bougainville and made suffragan of the Metropolitan Roman Catholic Archdiocese of Rabaul.

Missionary Ordinaries 
all in cumbents were members of the missionary congregation of Marists (S.M.)
 Prefect Apostolic of German Solomon Islands
 Friar Eugen Englert, S.M. (1899 – 1904)

 Prefects Apostolic of Northern Solomon Islands
 Friar Joseph Forestier, S.M. (1904 – 1918)
 Friar Maurice Boch, S.M. (1920 – 1929)

 Vicars Apostolic of Northern Solomon Islands
 Thomas James Wade, S.M. (1930.07.03 – 1960), Titular Bishop of Barbalissus 
 Leo Lemay, S.M. (1960.06.14 – 1966.11.15), titular Bishop of Agbia, who went on as first bishop of Bougainville (1966.11.15 – 1974.07.01)

See also 
 Catholic Church in Oceania

References

External links 
 GigaCatholic

1898 establishments in Oceania
Former Roman Catholic dioceses in Oceania
Catholic Church in the Solomon Islands